"Full Jump" (stylized as "FULL JUMP") is a song by Japanese singer-songwriter Rina Aiuchi. It was released on 14 May 2003 through Giza Studio, as the fourth single from her third studio album A.I.R.. The song was performed at the 54th Kōhaku Uta Gassen. The song reached number three in Japan and has sold over 72,065 copies nationwide, as well as being certified gold by the Recording Industry Association of Japan.

Track listing

Charts

Certification and sales

|-
! scope="row"| Japan (RIAJ)
| Gold
| 72,065
|-
|}

Release history

References

2003 singles
2003 songs
J-pop songs
Song recordings produced by Daiko Nagato
Songs written by Rina Aiuchi